Karl Johan Valdemar "Valle" Rautio (4 January 1921 – 5 September 1973) was a Finnish athlete who competed in the 1948 Summer Olympics and in the 1952 Summer Olympics. Rautio earned a gold medal in the 1946 European Athletics Championships in the Triple Jump, and achieved silver four years later.

References

External links
 
 
 
 

1921 births
1973 deaths
Finnish male triple jumpers
Olympic athletes of Finland
Athletes (track and field) at the 1948 Summer Olympics
Athletes (track and field) at the 1952 Summer Olympics
European Athletics Championships medalists
Sportspeople from Vaasa